Ptychoptera albimana  is a species of fly in the family Ptychopteridae. It can be found throughout the  Palearctic but commonly found throughout Britain.

Description 
The body of Ptychoptera albimana  is mostly black with distinct orange marking, usually on the dorsal section. The insect is most active between spring and fall, with the female laying 500 eggs.

References

Ptychopteridae
Insects described in 1787
Nematoceran flies of Europe